Ajangbadi is a suburban community located in Ojo, local government area of Lagos State. Its ZIP code is 102104.

See also
 Awori District settlements

References

Populated places in Lagos State